Mount Nukap is a mountain associated with the Baffin Mountains on Baffin Island, Nunavut, Canada.

References

Arctic Cordillera
One-thousanders of Nunavut